Porterville is a city in the San Joaquin Valley, in Tulare County, California, United States. It is part of the Visalia-Porterville metropolitan statistical area.
Since its incorporation in 1902, the city's population has grown as it annexed nearby unincorporated areas. The city's July 2019 population (not including East Porterville) was estimated at 59,599.

Porterville serves as a gateway to Sequoia National Forest, Giant Sequoia National Monument and Kings Canyon National Park.

History
During California's Spanish period, the San Joaquin Valley was considered a remote region of little value. Emigrants skirted the eastern foothills in the vicinity of Porterville as early as 1826. Swamps stretched out into the Valley floor lush with tall rushes or "tulare" as the Indigenous people called them.

Gold discovered in 1848 brought a tremendous migration to California, and prairie schooners rolled through Porterville between 1849 and 1852. Starting in 1854, Peter Goodhue operated a stopping place on the Stockton - Los Angeles Road on the bank of the Tule River. Wagon trains of gold seekers passed through the village, but other travelers found the land rich and remained to establish farms. A store was set up in 1856 to sell goods to miners and the Native Americans, who lived in tribal lands along the rivers. From 1858 to 1861 it was the location of the Tule River Station of the Butterfield Overland Mail.

Royal Porter Putnam came to the village in 1860 to raise cattle, horses and hogs. He bought out Goodhue the same year and turned the station into a popular stopping place and hotel called Porter Station. He bought 40 acres of land and built a two-story store and a hotel on the highest point of the swampy property, which is now the corner of Oak and Main. The town of Porterville was founded there in 1864. It took its name from the founder's given name because another Putnam family lived south of town.

In 1862  of rain fell in the area, causing a change of course of the Tule River. Putnam's acres drained and he had his property surveyed, staking out lot lines and establishing streets. Settlers were offered a free lot for every one purchased. The need of a burgeoning California population for food provided the impetus that led to the permanent development of the east side of the southern San Joaquin Valley. The long, dry, hot summer prompted irrigation of the lands.

In 1888 the Southern Pacific Railway brought in the branch line from Fresno. The Pioneer Hotel and Bank were built by businessmen from San Francisco. Porterville incorporated in 1902, as miners moved into the area to extract magnesite ore, and the Chamber of Commerce was formed in 1907. A City Manager-Council form of government was adopted in 1926 and a Charter was adopted. The city has grown from a community of 5,000 in 1920. Agriculture supplemented by the Central Valley Water Project has been the major source of economic growth in the area. The city is the center of a large farming area especially noted for citrus and livestock.

Industry has become a significant factor in the development of the community. The Walmart Distribution Center, National Vitamin, Beckman Instruments, Standard Register, Sierra Pacific Apparel, Royalty Carpeting and other small companies have facilities in Porterville. Several large public facilities are also located here. These include the Porterville Developmental Center, Sequoia National Forest Headquarters, the Army Corps of Engineers Lake Success Facility and the Porterville College campus of the Kern Community College District.

On March 10, 2023, the city was heavily impacted by catastrophic flash floods, which caused the National Weather Service to issue five separate flash flood emergencies for the city. The city was under these emergencies for nine and a half hours straight.

The Tule River Indian War of 1856

The Native Americans living in the foothills of the Sierra Nevada Mountains were relatively undisturbed by early Spanish colonization. During the late 1840s and into the 1850s, once gold was discovered in California, miners began encroaching on traditional lands. Although a treaty was signed with the local tribes in 1851, defining a proposed reservation and 200 head of cattle per year, the US Senate failed to ratify it, with every member either abstaining or voting no.

In the spring of 1856, a rumor that 500 cattle had been stolen by Native Americans began to circulate. Upon further investigation, it turned out that a single yearling calf had been taken as a bridal gift. Mobs of armed settlers were organized to counter the perceived menace, despite the peaceful intentions of the Native Americans. These mobs began raiding Native camps and killing their inhabitants.

One mob, under the leadership of Capt. Foster DeMasters, failed to dislodge a numerically superior Native encampment while wearing ineffective makeshift body armor consisting of cotton-padded jackets. Reinforcements were sent in from Keyesville and the resulting force, now under the leadership of Sheriff W.G. Poindexter, were similarly repulsed. After falling back, the mob then proceeded to wage a scorched-earth campaign by destroying Native American supply caches.

News of these engagements spread throughout California, exaggerating the degree of menace and misrepresenting its causes. Finally, in May 1856 army troops under the command of LaRhett Livingston assaulted the encampment and succeeded in driving off its defenders. The war's duration was approximately six weeks.

In retrospect, George Stewart wrote, "Thus ended the Tule River war of 1856; a war that might have been prevented had there been an honest desire on the part of the white settlers to do so, and one that brought little glory to those who participated therein. The responsibility cannot now be fixed where it properly belongs. Possibly the Indians were to blame. Certainly, the whites were not blameless, and it is too seldom, indeed, that they have been in the many struggles with the aboriginal inhabitants of this continent."

Historian Annie Mitchell later wrote in the Tulare County Historical Society bulletin (Los Tulares No. 68, March 1966): "Over the years it has been assumed that the Tule River War was a spontaneous, comic opera affair. It was not and if the Indians had been armed with guns instead of bows and a few pistols they would have run the white men out of the valley."

Geography
Porterville is located at  (36.068550, -119.027536).

Porterville is located on the Tule River at the base of the western foothills of the Sierra Nevada and easternmost section of California's Central Valley. In the foothills above Porterville is the man-made Lake Success.

The city has a strategic central location to major markets and a ready access to major transportation routes.

Geology
Porterville is subject to earthquakes due to its location within the Pacific Ring of Fire. The geologic instability involves numerous faults, which cause many earthquakes every year, but most are of low intensity and are not felt. The primary plate boundary is the San Andreas Fault, which was the source of the 1857 Fort Tejon earthquake. Another major event that affected the Porterville area was the Kern County sequence of shocks that occurred on the White Wolf Fault during July and August 1952. Most parts of the city are also vulnerable to floods. The San Joaquin Valley and metropolitan areas are also at risk from blind thrust earthquakes.

Climate
Porterville has a cool semi-arid climate (Köppen BSk) that is close to both a mediterranean climate (Csa) and a hot semi-arid climate (BSh). It is characterized by sweltering and arid summers, and pleasant winters with frosty mornings and occasional heavy rainfall.

Environmental issues
Owing to geography, heavy reliance on automobiles and agriculture, Porterville suffers from air pollution in the form of smog. The Porterville area and the rest of the San Joaquin Valley are susceptible to atmospheric inversion, which holds in the exhausts from road vehicles, airplanes, locomotives, agriculture, manufacturing and other sources. Unlike other cities that rely on rain to clear smog, Porterville gets only  of rain each year: pollution accumulates over many consecutive days. Issues of air quality in Porterville and other major cities led to the passage of early national environmental legislation, including the Clean Air Act. More recently, the state of California has led the nation in working to limit pollution by mandating low-emission vehicles. Smog levels are only high during summers because it is dry and warm. In the winter, storms help to clear the smog and it is not as much of a problem. Smog should continue to drop in the coming years due to aggressive steps to reduce it, electric and hybrid cars and other pollution-reducing measures taken.

As a result, pollution levels have dropped in recent decades. The number of Stage 1 smog alerts has declined from over 100 per year in the 1970s to almost zero in the new millennium. Despite improvement, the 2006 annual report of the American Lung Association ranked the city as the 11th most polluted in the country, with short-term particle pollution and year-round particle pollution.  In 2007 the annual report of the American Lung Association ranked the city as the 4th most polluted in the country with short-term particle pollution and year-round particle pollution.  In 2008, the city was ranked the third most polluted and again fourth for highest year-round particulate pollution.

Porterville is also experiencing environmental issues due to California's extreme drought. Most of the nearby unincorporated area of East Porterville has run out of its supply of groundwater, an unfortunate consequence of the entire unincorporated area relying heavily on private wells. Porterville spent much of 2014 sending shipments of bottled water to East Porterville.

Demographics

2010
The 2010 United States Census reported that Porterville had a population of 54,165. The racial makeup of Porterville was 31,847 (58.8%) White, 673 (1.2%) African American, 1,007 (1.9%) Native American, 2,521 (4.7%) Asian, 64 (0.1%) Pacific Islander, 15,482 (28.6%) from other races, and 2,571 (4.7%) from two or more races. Hispanic or Latino of any race were 33,549 persons (61.9%).

The Census reported that 53,018 people (97.9% of the population) lived in households, 207 (0.4%) lived in non-institutionalized group quarters, and 940 (1.7%) were institutionalized.

There were 15,644 households, out of which 8,177 (52.3%) had children under the age of 18 living in them, 8,032 (51.3%) were opposite-sex married couples living together, 2,962 (18.9%) had a female householder with no husband present, 1,315 (8.4%) had a male householder with no wife present. There were 1,424 (9.1%) unmarried opposite-sex partnerships, and 115 (0.7%) same-sex married couples or partnerships. 2,679 households (17.1%) were made up of individuals, and 1,193 (7.6%) had someone living alone who was 65 years of age or older. The average household size was 3.39. There were 12,309 families (78.7% of all households); the average family size was 3.78.

The population was spread out, with 18,154 people (33.5%) under the age of 18, 5,879 people (10.9%) aged 18 to 24, 14,266 people (26.3%) aged 25 to 44, 10,773 people (19.9%) aged 45 to 64, and 5,093 people (9.4%) who were 65 years of age or older. The median age was 28.8 years. For every 100 females, there were 97.9 males. For every 100 females age 18 and over, there were 95.2 males.

The homeowner vacancy rate was 2.9%; the rental vacancy rate was 6.3%.  30,016 people (55.4% of the population) lived in owner-occupied housing units and 23,002 people (42.5%) lived in rental housing units.

2000
As of the census of 2000, there were 39,615 people, 11,884 households, and 9,174 families residing in the city. The racial makeup of the city was 49.8% White, 1.3% African American, 1.7% Native American, 4.6% Asian, 0.2% Pacific Islander, 32.7% from other races, and 4.8% from two or more races. Hispanic or Latino of any race were 54.5% of the population.

There were 11,884 households, out of which 47.5% had children under the age of 18 living with them, 53.1% were married couples living together, 17.7% had a female householder with no husband present, and 22.8% were non-families. 19.1% of all households were made up of individuals, and 8.3% had someone living alone who was 65 years of age or older. The average household size was 3.20 and the average family size was 3.62.

In the city, the population was spread out, with 34.3% under the age of 18, 10.8% from 18 to 24, 28.0% from 25 to 44, 17.5% from 45 to 64, and 9.4% who were 65 years of age or older. The median age was 29 years. For every 100 females, there were 96.4 males. For every 100 females age 18 and over, there were 93.0 males.

The median income for a household in the city was $32,046, and the median income for a family was $35,136. Males had a median income of $31,171 versus $23,737 for females. The per capita income for the city was $12,745. About 20.3% of families and 25.7% of the population were below the poverty line, including 33.7% of those under age 18 and 6.4% of those age 65 or over.

Government

Municipal government
Under the California State Constitution, there is a difference in powers granted to cities. A "General Law City" is one, which operates exclusively under State law. The City Charter, in accordance with the State Constitution, provides the City with authority for "Home Rule" whereby the City is given the power to make and enforce within its own boundaries any law, which does not conflict with the State or Federal Government. The State Constitution gives this right of "Home Rule" to any city.

Porterville has operated as a Charter City since 1926, but the Charter has been changed by the voters several times since then.

During the November 2008 Prop 8 election campaign, Porterville's City Council was the only City Council in all of California that passed a Resolution in favor of Prop 8. The Resolution urged voters  to act on behalf of the Council's personal, religious, and political interests. Local gay rights activists, such as Porterville LGBTQ, protested at subsequent City Council meetings for months afterwards, getting the attention of local media. Prop 8 amended California's constitution to deny marriage rights for same-sex couples. Porterville, and Tulare County voters voted over 75% in favor of Prop 8, among the highest levels in the State of California, during the election. On August 4, 2010, Prop 8 was ruled unconstitutional under the 14th Amendment of the US Constitution. In June 2013, the mayor declared that month to be LGBT pride month, but that proclamation was subsequently rescinded by the city council. The City Council subsequently removed the Mayor responsible for introducing the proclamation, Virginia Gurrola. During a discussion on the establishment of anti-bullying youth safe zones, Gurrola's successor, Cam Hamilton, stated "I’m against bullying, but I’m getting damn tired of it being used as a mantra for everything when all most people have to do is grow a pair and stick up for them damn selves."

State and federal representation
In the California State Senate, Porterville is in the 14th district.

In the United States House of Representatives, Porterville is in

Infrastructure
The United States Postal Service operates the Main Post Office at 65 W. Mill Street, the Town & Country Post Office at 1316 W. Olive Avenue, the Doyle Colony Post Office at 1391 E. Springville Avenue, and the Poplar Post Office at 14653 Road 192. The Main Post Office is listed in the National Register of Historic Places.

Economy

Largest employers
According to the City's 2020 Comprehensive Annual Financial Report, the top employers in the city are:

In popular culture 
The sheriff in Big Top Pee-wee (1988) received a report from Porterville about a windstorm approaching Pee-wee Herman's local town.
It received the All-America City Award in 1994.
In the science fiction novel The Santaroga Barrier (1968) Porterville is the nearest "normal town" to the fictional Santaroga situated in a valley 25 miles to the east of Porterville.
In the science fiction novel Lucifer's Hammer (1977), this city is destroyed by the collapse of the dam at Lake Success.
Porterville is the home of the Persian Lime.
Porterville has three structures that are listed in the National Register of Historic Places (NRHP); The First Congregational Church, US Post Office- Porterville Main, The Zalud  House Museum.
John Fogerty wrote the song "Porterville" while he was in the army.  It was later recorded by his band, the Golliwogs.  While the song was not a hit for the Golliwogs, it propelled the changes that morphed that band into Creedence Clearwater Revival.  "Porterville" was then included on CCR's debut album titled Creedence Clearwater Revival.

Notable people

Barbara Baxley, (1923-'90), film, stage and television actress
Dick Brooks - NASCAR driver
Brant Brown - Fresno State and Major League Baseball outfielder (Chicago Cubs, Pittsburgh Pirates, and Florida Marlins)
Tex Clevenger - Fresno State and Major League Baseball pitcher (Boston Red Sox, Washington Senators, Los Angeles Angels, and New York Yankees)
Steve Cox - Major League Baseball first baseman (Tampa Bay Devil Rays)
Allen Drury - novelist and 1960 Pulitzer Prize winner
Jessica Govea - Labor organizer, she worked closely with Cesar Chavez and led the Toronto grape boycott at the age of 21. She later taught labor history at Rutgers University and Cornell University
Vernon Grant - Artist and creator of Kellogg's characters: Snap, Crackle, and Pop, graduated from Porterville High School, class of 1921
Wayne Hardin - College Football Hall of Famer, former head football coach at Porterville College 1952 and 1953
Sim Iness - Oklahoma-born Olympic gold medalist in discus throw
Joan Marsh - actress
Michel Moore - Chief of Police of the Los Angeles Police Department (LAPD)
Monte Moore - Major League Baseball player and Oakland Athletics broadcaster
Rance Mulliniks - Major League Baseball infielder (California Angels, Kansas City Royals, and Toronto Blue Jays)
Rick Owens - fashion designer
Bear Pascoe - football player for Fresno State and NFL's New York Giants
Charlotte Pendragon, two-time winner of Magician of the Year award
Helen M. Roberts - writer
James Sanders - football player for Fresno State and NFL's Atlanta Falcons
Bill Sharman - NBA Hall of Fame player and coach
Cam Smith - lead vocalist of international touring band Hotel Books
Joe Soto - professional mixed martial arts
Buzz Stephen - MLB pitcher
Kirsten Vangsness - actress (Criminal Minds)
Tim Vanni - two-time Olympic wrestler

Transportation

Highways and freeways
California State Route 65, known as the All-American City Highway or Porterville Freeway, is a major north-south freeway and expressway that heads north to Lindsay and south to Bakersfield. California State Route 190 is a major east-west highway in Porterville that heads west to California State Route 99 in Tipton and east bypassing East Porterville to Springville.

Major highways
 State Route 65
 State Route 190

County highways
(CR J15) – Porterville
(CR J26) – Porterville
(CR J27) – Porterville
(CR J28) – Porterville
(CR J29) – Porterville
(CR J37) – Porterville
(CR J42) – East Porterville

Public transportation
Porterville Transit operates environmentally-friendly and convenient public transportation to Porterville and the surrounding communities. Porterville COLT Paratransit service is designed for transit riders with disabilities that prevent them from using regular bus services. Porterville Transit and COLT services are provided within the city limits and to designated unincorporated urban areas of the county, including "county islands" within the city limits.

Tulare County Area Transit (TCaT) provides the public transit services between Porterville and smaller communities throughout the greater Porterville Area. Service includes Fixed Route and Demand Responsive services that are offered Monday through Saturday.

Air transportation
Porterville has one airport and offers 1 passenger Charter service, WestAir. The Porterville Municipal Airport.
	the nearby commercial airports include:

 Fresno Yosemite International Airport, owned by the City of Fresno; serves the San Joaquin Valley.
 Meadows Field Airport, also known as Kern County Airport #1, serves the South Valley and the Greater Metropolitan Bakersfield.

Media

Newspaper
The Porterville Recorder is the daily newspaper serving Greater Porterville.

Radio Station
Radio stations  KIOO (99.7 FM), K289AZ (105.7 FM, rebroadcasts KAWF), KMQA (100.5 FM) and  KTIP (1450 AM).

Television
TV station KTFF-DT and KVVG-LP are all licensed to Porterville.

Attractions

Golf
Porterville Municipal Golf Course
River Island Country Club

Casino
Eagle Mountain Casino

Museums
Porterville Historical Museum
Zalud House

Motorsports
Porterville off- Highway Vehicle Park
Rocky Hill Speedway

Performing arts
Barn Theatre
Frank "Buck" Shaffer Auditorium  (Porterville Memorial Auditorium)

Shopping
The Porterville Marketplace
Riverwalk Marketplace
Main street (Downtown Porterville)

Festivals and events
Band-O-Rama (November)
Sierra Winter Classic Livestock Jackpot (January)
Orange Blossom Klassic Livestock Jackpot (February)
Iris Festival (April)
Porterville Celebrates Reading Fair (April)
Springville Rodeo (Last Full weekend in April)
Porterville Fair (May 15–19)
Springville Apple Festival (October)
Pioneer Days & Rib Cook-Off (October)
Annual Veterans Day Parade (November 11)
Annual Christmas Children's Parade

Outdoor recreation
Porterville Municipal Pool
Sequoia National Forest
Sequoia National Monument
Tule River Indian Reservation
Lake Success
Golden Trout Wilderness Pack Train
Balch Park Pack Station
Tule River
Bartlett Park

Education
Most of Porterville is served by the Porterville Unified School District, while portions of the western section of the city are zoned to the Burton Elementary School District

Schools in the Porterville Unified School District

Elementary schools
SantaFe Elementary School
Los Robles Elementary School
Vandalia Elementary School
Roche Avenue Elementary School
Belleview Elementary School 
John J. Doyle Elementary School
Monte Vista Elementary School
Olive Street Elementary School
Westfield Elementary School
West Putnam Elementary School
Oak Grove Elementary School
William R. Buckley Elementary School
Jim Maples Academy
Summit Charter Academy- Mathew Campus
Summit Charter Academy- Lombardi Campus
Burton Elementary School

Middle schools
Pioneer Middle School
Sequoia Middle School
Bartlett Middle School
Horizon Community Day School

Alternative high schools
Prospect Education Center
Vine Street Community School

Adult schools
Porterville Adult School

Schools in the Burton School District

Middle schools
Burton Middle School
Summit Charter Intermediate Academy

High schools
Summit Charter Collegiate Academy

Alternative schools
Burton Charter Home School

School Districts of the Greater Porterville area
Alta Vista Elementary School District
Burton School District
Ducor Elementary School District
Hope Elementary School District
Hot Springs School District
Lindsay Unified School District
Pleasant View Elementary School District
Porterville Unified School District
Rockford Elementary School District
Saucelito Elementary School District
Springville Union Elementary School District
Strathmore Union Elementary School District
Sunnyside Union Elementary School District
Terra Bella Elementary School District
Woodville Union Elementary School District

Higher education
There is one community college in Porterville, Porterville College (PC), and National University maintains a learning center within Porterville College.

In May 2017 San Joaquin Valley College opened a branch on Main Street; SJVC will be located in the former Family Health Care Network corporate offices and will use  of the building per city policies until the city decides if it will allow the branch to operate as a full campus. It is expected that in the near future SJVC Porterville branch will also use the former bank building located next door for further expansion.

Courts
Tulare County - District Attorney- Office - 87 East Morton Avenue
Social Security Administration - Office - 890 West Morton Avenue

South County Justice Center

The new nine-courtroom, 96,000-square-foot courthouse replaced the previous overcrowded Porterville Courthouse. Completed in fall 2013, the $93 million courthouse — which was built by Sundt Construction Inc. and designed by CO Architects — provides the necessary space for expansion and enhanced security, enabling the court to greatly improve access and services.

The facility features chambers, courtroom holdings, jury deliberations rooms, support services, clerks offices and work areas, public walk-up windows and queuing, holding and below-grade sally port. The approximately eight-acre site includes parking and circulation and a featured courtyard scheme.

The courthouse is designed to achieve a LEED Silver certification by the U.S. Green Building Council. The building includes high-performance glass, window-shading devices to prevent direct sunlight, and better-insulated walls and roof, and a rain screen system.

It has more energy-efficient mechanical units, which incorporate the partial use of chilled beam passive cooling and radiant heat. The lighting will be high-efficient fluorescent and LED fixtures.

Other sustainable features include: low-use water fixtures and landscape, green roofs, recycling construction materials, the use of regional material and renewable materials as well as certified wood and natural light.

The center was funded under the Trial Court Facilities Act of 2002, made the state of California responsible for court facilities and court construction statewide, and designated a portion of court-user fees and penalties collected to fund the project.

Shopping centers
Porterville Town Center

Parks

Sister cities

Porterville's sister cities are:
 La Barca, Mexico
 Hamamatsu, Japan

References

External links

 
Incorporated cities and towns in California
Cities in Tulare County, California
Butterfield Overland Mail in California
1902 establishments in California
Populated places established in 1902